Garran is a suburb in the Woden district of Canberra in the Australian Capital Territory. Garran was named after Sir Robert Garran who made numerous contributions to the development of higher education in Canberra. The streets in Garran are named after Australian writers. The suburb was first settled in 1966 and has an area of 2.74 km2.

Population

The next most common countries of birth were India (6.8%) and England (3.9%). 66.8% of people spoke only English at home. Other languages spoken at home included Mandarin (3.0%), Telugu (2.5%) and Malayalam (2.3%). The most common responses for religion were No Religion (38.5%) and Catholic (21.5%).

Geology

Garran contains volcanic materials from the Silurian Age.
Deakin volcanics purple and green tuff is under the Canberra hospital, around Ingamells Street in the north and the base of Davidson Hill. Deakin Volcanics coarse dark purple rhyodacite is under Fitchett Street and Couvreur Street areas. Deakin Volcanics green grey and purple rhyodacite is in the center and south of Garran.

Suburb amenities

The Canberra Hospital is located in Garran. The suburb also contains three primary schools: a government school, Garran Primary; a special school for the intellectually disabled, Malkara School and a Catholic school, Sts. Peter & Paul Primary School.

References

External links

ABC RealMedia story on the suburb from the Canberra's Suburbs series.

Suburbs of Canberra